The Yumare massacre was an incident in which agents of DISIP, the counter-intelligence agency of Venezuela, killed nine social activists, confused with a guerrilla group. It took place on 8 May 1986 in Yaracuy state, Venezuela. At the time, officials falsely claimed that the activists ambushed the DISIP agents and were killed during an armed confrontation. The actual circumstances of the incident were revealed in 2011 by retired Army General Alexis Ramón Sanchéz, who admitted his role in the killings.

Investigation 
An investigation was re-opened in 2006, which led to 29 participants in the massacre being charged in September 2006, including both Jaime Lusinchi, then-president of Venezuela, and Henry López Sisco, then head of DISIP. López Sisco was able to evade arrest and flee the country.

In May 2011, retired Army General Alexis Ramón Sanchéz, having confessed his role in the massacre and identified others responsible, was sentenced to 13 years' in prison. His sentence length was reduced due to his cooperation, and he was permitted to serve it at home due to his age and ill health.

See also
List of massacres in Venezuela

References

1986 in Venezuela
Massacres in 1986
May 1986 events in South America
May 1986 crimes
Massacres in Venezuela
1986 crimes in Venezuela